In American politics, fusionism is the philosophical and political combination or "fusion" of traditionalist and social conservatism with political and economic right-libertarianism. The philosophy is most closely associated with Frank Meyer.

Intellectual founding and positions
The philosophy of "fusionism" was developed at National Review magazine during the 1950s under the editorship of William F. Buckley, Jr. and is most identified with his associate editor Frank Meyer. As Buckley recounted the founding, he "brokered" between "an extraordinary mix" of libertarians, traditional conservatives, anti-communists and even an anarchist to produce the ideas and writings that produced modern conservatism. He identified Meyer's synthesis as the most likely best solution of defining conservatism.

In his most influential book, In Defense of Freedom, Meyer defined freedom in what Isaiah Berlin would label "negative" terms as the minimization of the use of coercion by the state in its essential role of preventing one person's freedom from intruding upon another's. The state should protect freedom but otherwise leave virtue to individuals. The state has only three legitimate functions – police, military and operating a legal system, all necessary to control coercion, which is immoral if not restricted. Virtue is critical for society and freedom must be balanced by responsibility but both are inherently individual in form. Coerced values cannot be virtuous. Freedom by itself has no goal, no intrinsic end. Freedom is not abstract or utopian as with the utilitarians, who also make freedom an end rather than a means. In a real society traditional order and freedom can only exist together.  The solution is a philosophical synthesis of both freedom and tradition, the solution to the dilemma is "grasping it by both horns" and accepting the tension between the two.

Fusionism's most famous advocate was Ronald Reagan as an early admirer of National Review and associate of both editors. On assuming the presidency in 1981, he met with conservative leaders around the country in Washington and reminded them of their intellectual roots. After listing "intellectual leaders like Russell Kirk, Friedrich Hayek, Henry Hazlitt, Milton Friedman, James Burnham, [and] Ludwig von Mises" as the ones who "shaped so much of our thoughts," he discussed only one of these influences at length:

As he recalled him, the new president outlined the ideas Meyer synthesized as the principles for this new conservative movement.

Political history
Fusionism saw its height during the presidency of Ronald Reagan, who had brought together the divided factions after Gerald Ford's loss in the 1976 election. In the immediate aftermath of the Republican takeover of Congress in 1994, fusionism was also at its height. The social conservative element of the Republican Party was seen on the ascent (at least with respect to domestic politics) during the presidency of George W. Bush. Increased spending angered traditional conservatives, fiscal conservatives, and libertarians. In addition, the long-standing tensions between neoconservatives and paleoconservatives bubbled over in the wake of the Iraq War.

While both these principles are traditionally conservative, the equal emphasis of traditional morality and free markets is a characteristic of fusionism.

Following the Republican Party's defeat in the 2006 midterm elections, some were calling for a new "fusionism" between libertarians and liberals in the Democratic Party to address what is seen as increasing governmental interference in private activity. The results of the 2008 elections and the financial crisis of 2007–2008 have brought renewed tension between the  libertarians and the social conservatives with centrist economic views.

Fusionists tend to see the unpopularity of George W. Bush's "compassionate conservatism," such as in his new entitlement prescription drug program, and his party's following defeat by President Barack Obama in 2008 and 2012, as reasons requiring a fusionist renewal if conservatism was ever to regain the presidency.

Criticism
In a polemic, the traditional conservative philosopher Russell Kirk, quoting T. S. Eliot's expression, called libertarians "chirping sectaries".  He added that although conservatives and libertarians share opposition to collectivism, the totalist state and bureaucracy, they have otherwise nothing in common. He called the libertarian movement "an ideological clique forever splitting into sects still smaller and odder, but rarely conjugating". Asserting a division between believers in "some sort of transcendent moral order" and "utilitarians admitting no transcendent sanctions for conduct", he included libertarians in the latter category. Kirk had questioned fusionism between libertarians and traditional conservatives that marked much of post-World War II conservatism in the United States.

Kirk also berated libertarians for holding up capitalism as an absolute good, arguing that economic self-interest was inadequate to hold an economic system together, and even less adequate to preserve order. He said that by glorifying the individual, the free market, and the dog-eat-dog struggle for material success, libertarianism weakened community, promoted materialism, and undermined appreciation of tradition, love, learning, and aesthetics, all of which he believed were essential components of true community.

Author Carl Bogus stated that there were fundamental differences between libertarians and traditional conservatives: Libertarians wanted the market to be unregulated as possible while traditional conservatives believed that big business, if unconstrained, could impoverish national life and threaten freedom. He said libertarians also believed that a strong state would threaten freedom, while traditional conservatives believed that a strong state, properly constructed to ensure that not too much power accumulated in any one branch, was necessary to ensure freedom.

Fusionism has come under significant attack since 2014, especially by Catholic integralists. In 2018, these critiques have also been taken up by mainstream conservative commentators.

List of critics

 L. Brent Bozell Jr. – traditionalist Catholic political author; Young Americans for Freedom (YAF) Alum
 Ayn Rand – novelist and founder of Objectivism, who clashed with traditional conservatives and with libertarians
 Murray Rothbard – libertarian author and economist; Young Americans for Freedom (YAF) Alum
 Patrick Buchanan – political commentator and prominent paleoconservative; Young Americans for Freedom (YAF) Alum
 Sohrab Ahmari – opinion editor of The New York Post

See also

 Big tent
 Fusion Party
 Libertarian conservatism
 Neoconservatism and paleoconservatism
 Neo-libertarianism
 Outline of libertarianism

Notes

References
 
 
 Feser, Edward. "Hayek and Fusionism"
 Kling, Arnold.  "Why Be a Conservative Libertarian?"
 Lindsey, Brink. "Liberaltarians"
 Sager, Ryan (2006). The Elephant in the Room: Evangelicals, Libertarians and the Battle to Control the Republican Party, Hoboken, NJ: John Wiley,

External links
 Jonah Goldberg (November 5, 2015), "Fusionism, 60 Years Later" – National Review

American political philosophy
Economic ideologies
Libertarian terms
Libertarianism in the United States
Paleolibertarianism
Political theories
Right-wing politics
Right-libertarianism